"Never Let Go" is the first single by English progressive rock band Camel, released in November 1972. The B-side of the single is the Peter Bardens song "Curiosity". It is from their debut album Camel (1973), and is widely considered their most memorable song; it is probably their best known. In addition to the single version (which is shortened from the album version), the band has recorded versions of the song for three different live albums (the song is the title track of the band's 1993 live double CD Never Let Go, recorded in the Netherlands) and it was featured on a compilation. It is the band's most popular live song. The songwriting is credited to guitarist Andrew Latimer.

Structure
The song starts with Latimer repeatedly playing a ten-second riff four times as other instruments fill the song. Then comes the first verse, where Peter Bardens sings. There is a short instrumental break, and then comes the second verse, with Bardens singing again. Afterward, there is a long keyboard solo by Bardens, and then comes the last verse. After the last verse, there is a guitar solo by Latimer until the song fades out.

References

External links
 Camel review

1972 debut singles
Canterbury scene
Camel (band) songs
1972 songs
MCA Records singles